Corrections is society's handling of persons after their conviction of a criminal offense.

Corrections may also refer to:

 Corrections (film), a 2008 Australian short
 The Corrections, a 2001 novel by Jonathan Franzen
 The Corrections (band), a British rock band
 Department of Corrections (New Zealand)
 Corrections, a YouTube-exclusive segment of Late Night with Seth Meyers

See also 
 Correction (disambiguation)